Stoudemire is a surname. Notable people with the surname include:

 Amar'e Stoudemire (born 1982), American-Israeli NBA and Israel Basketball Premier League basketball player 
 Jeff Stoudemire (born 1957), American professional boxer

See also
 Stoudamire